is the first full-length studio album released by An Cafe on November 9, 2005.  The album peaked at No. 39 on the Japanese albums chart.

Track listing

Personnel
 Miku – vocals
 Bou – guitar
 Kanon – bass guitar
 Teruki – drums

References

2005 albums
An Cafe albums